Butcher Hill is an action game developed and published by Gremlin Graphics in 1989. In this game, the player controls a team of five soldiers who have to survive in the Vietnamese jungle and kill as many enemies as possible. In the first part, the player's team is in a boat on a river with many rocks, mines and enemy fighters trying to sink it. If there is at least one remaining soldier at the end of the first part, the player enters the second part, a simulated 3D view of the jungle, shooting enemy soldiers and evading mines.

Reception

The Spanish magazine Microhobby gave the game the following scores: Originality: 40%, Graphics: 70%, Motion: 60%, Sound: 70%, Difficulty: 80%, Addiction: 60%.

References

External links
Play Butcher Hill online
https://web.archive.org/web/20071028194751/http://www.thelegacy.de/Museum/game.php3?titel_id=7530&game_id=7635

1989 video games
Action video games
Amiga games
Amstrad CPC games
Atari ST games
Commodore 64 games
Video games scored by Barry Leitch
Video games scored by Ben Daglish
Video games developed in the United Kingdom
ZX Spectrum games